Clément Vincent (May 18, 1931 – April 4, 2018) was a Canadian politician and a Member of the House of Commons of Canada.

Background

He was born on May 18, 1931 in Sainte-Perpétue, Centre-du-Québec.  He was a farmer and an entrepreneur.

Mayor

Vincent served as Mayor of Sainte-Perpétue from January 19, 1959 to January 11, 1961.

Member of Parliament

He successfully ran as a Progressive Conservative candidate for the district Nicolet—Yamaska in the 1962 federal election.  He was re-elected in the 1963 and 1965 elections, but resigned in 1966 to enter provincial politics.

Provincial politics

Vincent won a seat to the Legislative Assembly of Quebec in 1966 in the district of Nicolet.  He supported the Union Nationale and was appointed to the Cabinet, serving as Minister of Agriculture and Colonization from 1966 to 1970.  He was re-elected in the 1970 election, but was defeated in the district of Nicolet-Yamaska in the 1973 election.

Retirement

From 1978 to 1983, Vincent was employed by the Chief Electoral Officer of Quebec. Vincent died on 4 April 2018 at the age of 86.

References

1931 births
2018 deaths
French Quebecers
Mayors of places in Quebec
Members of the House of Commons of Canada from Quebec
Progressive Conservative Party of Canada MPs
Union Nationale (Quebec) MNAs
People from Centre-du-Québec